Stjärnsunds manufakturverk was a Swedish mechanical manufacturing company, most known for its production of clocks. It was founded in 1700, in the town Stjärnsund near Hedemora, by inventor and industrialist Christopher Polhem (né Polhammar).

Today, there is a company named Stiernsunds-ur which produces clocks according to Polhem's design, and performs repairs and maintenance on the originals.

References

Swedish brands
Clock brands
Companies established in 1700
1700 establishments in Sweden
Manufacturing companies established in 1700